Kenya competed in the 2014 Commonwealth Games in Glasgow, Scotland from 23 July – 3 August 2014.

Medalists

Athletics

Men

Women

Badminton

Mixed team

Pool B

Cycling

Mountain biking

Road

Women

Judo

Men

Women

Rugby sevens

Kenya has qualified a rugby sevens team.

Shooting

Women

Swimming

Men

Women

 Talisa Lanoe finished in equal 16th position in the heats alongside Northern Ireland's Danielle Hill. A swim-off was held between the two competitors which Hill won and was awarded with the 16th and last qualification place in to the semifinal.

Triathlon

Weightlifting

Men

Women

 Powerlifting

Wrestling

Men's freestyle

Women's freestyle

References

Nations at the 2014 Commonwealth Games
Kenya at the Commonwealth Games
2014 in Kenyan sport